Younes Yaqoub (Arabic:يونس يعقوب) (born 14 March 1986) is a Qatari footballer. He currently plays .

External links
 

Qatari footballers
1986 births
Living people
Qatar SC players
Umm Salal SC players
Al-Rayyan SC players
Al-Shahania SC players
Qatar Stars League players
Qatari Second Division players
Association football defenders